The Awful Truth were a progressive metal band from the late 1980s based in Houston, Texas, United States.

They were a three piece consisting of bassist Monty Colvin, drummer Alan Doss and guitarist David Von Ohlerking. They only released one album, the eponymously titled The Awful Truth. After the band split, Colvin and Doss formed the Galactic Cowboys.

According to producer/manager Sam Taylor, Ohlerking named the band after the old 1937 movie of the same name.

According to Colvin, Metal Blade Records signed the band after they had broken up. Metal Blade Records actually took the band's demos, mastered them and released them as The Awful Truth's debut album.

The Awful Truth album

Track listing
"It Takes So Long" – 5:46
"Circle" – 5:18
"I Should Have Known" – 7:32
"Higher" – 7:17
"Ghost of Heaven" – 4:41
"No Good Reason" – 6:16
"Drowning Man" – 5:56
"Mary" – 5:31

Credits 
Monty Colvin - Bass, vocals 
Alan Doss - Drums, vocals
David Von Ohlerking - Guitar, lead vocals
Jack van Skilling - zither
Tom Mason - dulcimer
Brandon Shea - maracas, yodelling
Derik Van Reenan - Cover art concept
Randy Rogers - Cover art
Steve Ames - Engineer
Tony Dawsey - Mastering

Musical groups from Houston